Traute Schäfer (born 20 September 1942) is a German volleyball player. She competed in the women's tournament at the 1972 Summer Olympics.

References

1942 births
Living people
German women's volleyball players
Olympic volleyball players of West Germany
Volleyball players at the 1972 Summer Olympics
Sportspeople from Hanover